Gitarijada is a music festival held in Zaječar, Serbia.

Held since 1966, Gitarijada is one of the longest lasting festivals in Serbia and in South Eastern Europe and the largest festival of young and unaffirmed bands in South Eastern Europe. Apart from the competition of unaffirmed bands from the region of former Yugoslavia, the festival program includes performances of established acts.

History

Gitarijada was founded in 1966 by Zlatni Prsti guitarist and vocalist Momčilo Radenković. First Gitarijada was held in Dom JNA in Zaječar. During the following years, Kosta Kostadinović "Čauš" became the festival's main organizer.

Because there were no official records of winners until 1974, not all the winners before this year are officially documented.

See also

List of historic rock festivals

References

External links
Official page
EX YU ROCK enciklopedija 1960-2006,  Janjatović Petar;  

Rock festivals in Serbia
Music festivals in Serbia
Serbian rock music
Yugoslav rock music
Zaječar
Music festivals established in 1966
Recurring events established in 1966